Loeb's NY Deli is a historic kosher-style deli in downtown Washington, D.C., United States. Opened in 1959 by Walter Loeb, the deli was originally located at the corner of 15th and G Streets, NW, in a space currently occupied by the Old Ebbitt Grill. In the 1970s the deli moved to the U.S. Export-Import Bank (Lafayette) building, and was made to move again in 2010 because of a Recovery Act-funded renovation. It is now located at 1712 I Street, and run by Dave, Marlene and Steve Loeb, the children of founder Walter Loeb.

See also 
 List of Ashkenazi Jewish restaurants
 List of delicatessens

References 

Ashkenazi Jewish culture in Washington, D.C.
Ashkenazi Jewish restaurants
Downtown (Washington, D.C.)
Jewish delicatessens in the United States
Kosher style restaurants
Restaurants established in 1959
Restaurants in Washington, D.C.
1959 establishments in Washington, D.C.